Pseudoleptorhynchoides is a monotypic genus of worms belonging to the family Rhadinorhynchidae. The only species is Pseudoleptorhynchoides lamothei.

The species is found in Central America.

References

Monotypic animal genera
Rhadinorhynchidae
Acanthocephala genera